The Strâmbu is a left tributary of the river Sălătruc in Romania. It flows into the Sălătruc in Chiuiești.

References

Rivers of Romania
Rivers of Cluj County